Brady is a nickname, usually a short form of Brayden (or spelling variations thereof). It may refer to:

 Brady Cowell (1899–1989), American college football, basketball and baseball head coach and athletic director
 Brady Murray (born 1984), Canadian ice hockey player
 Brady Quinn (born 1984), American football player
 Brady Tkachuk (born 1999), American ice hockey player

Lists of people by nickname
Hypocorisms